Arseniy Yuriyovych Korkodym (born 3 October 2002) is a Ukrainian professional footballer who plays as a goalkeeper for Ukrainian club Volyn Lutsk.

References

External links
 Profile on Volyn Lutsk official website
 

2002 births
Living people
Footballers from Kyiv
Ukrainian footballers
Association football goalkeepers
FC Volyn Lutsk players
Ukrainian First League players
Ukrainian Second League players